Auchtertool is a small village in Fife, Scotland. It is 4 miles west of Kirkcaldy. The name is from the Gaelic uachdar, meaning upland or heights above the Tiel burn (from Gaelic tuil meaning torrent). The Tiel Burn flows a few hundred yards south of the kirk and village, which was formerly known as Milton of Auchtertool. The parish belonged to the diocese of Dunkeld, having been given to Bishop Gregory by King David I in the twelfth century. Soon after, the church was given to the priory of Inchcolm.

History

The kirk, 1 km to the west of the village, pre-dates the Reformation but was largely reconstructed in 1833 as a plain box chapel. It was previously under the control of Inchcolm Abbey.

It has two battlemented porches on the south side and an octagonal birdcage bellcote on the west gable. The north aisle was added in 1905–6. The graveyard contains 17th century table stones; one commemorates David Martin, minister of Auchtertool who died in 1636. It is carved with a relief of the minister in knee breeches and gown with his feet on a skull. The Gothic Revival manse was built in 1812. Auchtertool House is a large early 19th century villa.

Hallyards Castle formerly stood north-west of the main village. Supposed originally to have been a hunting seat of Malcolm Canmore, it was the residence of the Bishops of Dunkeld until 1539.  King James V visited the castle after his defeat at the Battle of Solway Moss in late November 1542. According to John Knox, when the lady of the house tried to comfort the king, he announced that he would be dead in fifteen days. Later, his servant asked where James would spend Christmas. "He answerit, with at disdainfull Smirk, I cannot tell, chuse ye the Plaice; but this I can tell you, or [by] Yulle-Day ye will be Maisterless, and the Realme without a King." The king returned to Falkland where he learnt of the birth of his daughter Mary on 8 December. He died on 14 December. The castle was mostly demolished in 1847; some remains can be found on farmland north-west of the village centre.

At the time of the Jacobite rising of 1715 the rebel John Erskine, Earl of Mar was in Perth when he heard that a loyalist ship loaded with arms had dropped anchor at Burntisland. He set out to capture it, advancing 500 Highland soldiers into Auchtertool to be held in reserve. The men ran amok, plundering the village, including the manse.

Tradition maintains that a funeral attended by the writer Walter Scott was held at the kirk and solemnised according to the Roman Catholic rite. This illegal ceremony took place at dead of night to avoid detection by the Protestant authorities. Legend has it that the funeral procession can be seen on an August night heading towards the kirk from Hallyards Castle.

Alexander Boswell was mortally wounded in a duel in Auchtertool in 1822. He died in nearby Balmuto House. The duel was one of the last in Scotland.

From 1650, the village had a brewery, gaining a reputation for the quality of its ale, porter and table beer, not only throughout Fife but shipping as far as London. From 1845 the brewery was converted to a malt whisky distillery, commencing operation in 1851, and maintaining its reputation for a quality product. Distilling  ceased in 1927 but the maltings and bonded warehouse continued operation until 1973. The warehouses were used as a canteen by Polish soldiers, encamped nearby during the Second World War. The buildings are now largely demolished, only a small brick office remaining.

Auchtertool's only school is Auchtertool Primary School. High school pupils travel to Balwearie High School in Kirkcaldy.

See also
List of places in Fife
List of places in Scotland

References

External links

Village web site

Villages in Fife
Parishes in Fife